Hanzon is a surname. Notable people with the surname include:

Lonnie Hanzon (born 1959), American artist
Thomas Hanzon (born 1962), Swedish actor

See also
Hanlon
Hanson (surname)